IMAscore is a German company in the creative industry based in Paderborn, founded in 2009. The team consists primarily of composers and sound designers and is known for its specialization in soundtrack production for amusement parks. IMAscore has also been producing music for film and video game trailers since 2016.

History 

The company was founded in 2009 by Andreas Kübler, Sebastian Kübler and Xaver Willebrand. The founders got to know each other via the Internet and had previously pursued joint projects, such as the space rock band Between Horizons, which released two albums. The soundtrack for Krake roller coaster, which opened at Heide Park in 2011, was the first for an amusement park. Soundtracks for various amusement parks and attractions around the world followed. After achieving market leadership in Europe in 2014, the company has developed into the world market leader in the field of music and sound production for amusement parks by 2017.

With IMAscore, Andreas Kübler was responsible for the composition of additional music for the animated film Sam – Ein fast perfekter Held, which was published in Germany by Universum Film in 2016.

The company received increased media attention from 2016 onwards with the production of music for TV spots and for trailers for films and computer games. IMAscore achieved one of the first major placements of his music with the Omen trailer for the video game Final Fantasy XV published on October 27, 2016. The track Endlessness used in the trailer was then clicked over a million times on YouTube (as of 2019).

The trailer for Insidious: The Last Key, set to music by IMAscore, was nominated at the Golden Trailer Awards 2018 in the category Best Horror. At the award ceremony in Los Angeles on May 31, 2018, the award in the category finally went to the "Hunt" trailer for the film A Quiet Place.

On October 5, 2018, the founders of IMAscore were guests on the live television program Hier und heute of the WDR on the subject of music production for trailers. The company was also presented in the program 17:30 Sat.1.

Composer Andreas Kübler produced the music for the teaser trailer for The Lion King (2019) published on November 22, 2018. The trailer is currently (as of 2019) the most successful Disney film, with 224.6 million clicks worldwide within the first 24 hours of publication.

Productions 
The following soundtracks were produced and sold by the company:

Trailers (selection)

TV-Spots (selection)

Amusement parks (selection)

Television (selection)

Discography

Soundtrack CDs (Auswahl)

EPs

Awards 
 2012: European Talent Award in category Best Sound Design for Sebastian Kübler, given at the SoundTrack Cologne 9.0
 2012: Kultur- und Kreativpiloten Deutschland, given by Initiative Kultur- und Kreativwirtschaft des Bundes
 2013: FKF Award for Soundtrack of the theme area of Magische Vallei at Toverland, given by Freundeskreis Kirmes und Freizeitparks (FKF)
 2013: 2nd place Gründerpreis NRW

References

External links 
 
 

Music companies of Germany
Soundtrack record labels
Film soundtracks
Film sound production
German companies established in 2009